Rautavesi is a medium-sized lake in Finland. It is located in the municipality of Sastamala in the Pirkanmaa region in western Finland. Its main inflow is the lake Kulovesi in the east and it drains into the lake Liekovesi through the Vammaskoski rapids in the west. Lake Liekovesi, in its turn drains into the Kokemäenjoki river.

See also
List of lakes in Finland

References
 Rautavesi-liekovesi in Järviwiki Web service 

Kokemäenjoki basin
Landforms of Pirkanmaa
Lakes of Sastamala